Richard Walsh (1889 – 4 December 1957) was an Irish Fianna Fáil politician. He was first elected to Dáil Éireann as a Teachta Dála (TD) for the Mayo South constituency at the September 1927 general election. He was re-elected at each subsequent election until he lost his Dáil seat at the 1943 general election, he was, however, elected to the 4th Seanad by the Administrative Panel in 1943 Seanad election. He regained his Dáil seat at the 1944 general election and remained a member of the lower house until his retirement in 1951.

References

1889 births
1957 deaths
Fianna Fáil TDs
Members of the 6th Dáil
Members of the 7th Dáil
Members of the 8th Dáil
Members of the 9th Dáil
Members of the 10th Dáil
Members of the 4th Seanad
Members of the 12th Dáil
Members of the 13th Dáil
Fianna Fáil senators